The 2012 Buffalo State Bengals football team represented Buffalo State College as a member of the Empire 8 during the 2012 NCAA Division III football season. They were led by 19th-year head coach Jerry Boyes and played their home games at Coyer Field. On September 15, Buffalo State went on the road and defeated the three-time defending NCAA Division III champions and top-ranked , 7–6, winning the game on a touchdown pass in the game's final seconds. The victory by the Bengals snapped Wisconsin–Whitewater's 46-game winning streak, preventing the Warhawks from extending the streak to 47 games, which would have been the third-longest winning streak in National Collegiate Athletic Association (NCAA) football history.

Schedule

References

Buffalo State
Buffalo State Bengals football seasons
Buffalo State Bengals football